Yawar Q'asa (Quechua yawar blood, q'asa mountain pass, "blood pass", Hispanicized spelling Yahuarjasa) is a mountain in the Chunta mountain range in the Andes of Peru, about  high. It is located in the Huancavelica Region, Castrovirreyna Province, on the border of the districts of Castrovirreyna and Santa Ana. Yawar Q'asa lies southwest of Antarasu

References

Mountains of Huancavelica Region
Mountains of Peru